Benassi Bros. is an Italian electronica group. The members of the group, cousins Benny Benassi and Alle Benassi, started DJing in the late 1980s in their hometown, before moving to Larry Pignagnoli's Off Limits production studio in the mid-1990s, creating music for various acts, including Whigfield, J.K. and Ally & Jo. Despite the name "Benassi Bros.", Benny Benassi and Alle Benassi are actually cousins. Their track "Illusion" became very popular in the American club scene, finally peaking at number 4 on Hot Dance Club Play. Following "Hit My Heart" peaked at 15.

Discography 

Studio albums
 Pumphonia (2004)
 ...Phobia (2005)
 Hit My Heart (Best of Dhany) (2021)

Greatest hits album
 Best of Benassi Bros. (2005)
 Best of Benassi Bros. (2006)

Music videos
From Pumphonia
 Illusion  (#4 Hot Dance Club Play)
 Hit My Heart  (#15 Hot Dance Club Play)

From ...Phobia
 Make Me Feel
 Every Single Day  (#24 Hot Dance Singles Sales - 2005) (duet with Dhany)
 Rocket in the Sky

References

See also
 Benny Benassi
 Alle Benassi
 Sandy
 Dhany
 Larry Pignagnoli
 Whigfield

External links
 Off Limits Productions
 Sfaction, Benny Benassi's official Russian website

Electronic music duos
Italian dance music groups
Musical groups established in the 1980s